Exeristis is a genus of moths of the family Crambidae.

Species
Exeristis asynopta Tams, 1935
Exeristis asyphela Meyrick, 1886
Exeristis catharia Tams, 1935
Exeristis xanthota Meyrick, 1886

References

Pyraustinae
Crambidae genera
Taxa named by Edward Meyrick